The Verhoeven Open is a three-cushion billiards tournament held in Flushing, Queens in the US state of New York. The event is sanctioned by the Union Mondiale de Billard and the United States Billiard Association. The event was known as Sang Lee International Open between 2005 and 2008.

History

Sang Lee International Open 
It was founded in 2005 as the Sang Lee International Open, named after Sang Lee, a Korean American player whose goal was to spread his principles as a player and restore the popularity of carom billiards in the United States. One year after his death in 2004, his friend Ira Lee initiated the tournament in tribute to him. It was organized by the United States Billiard Association (USBA) as a member of the world federation Union Mondiale de Billard. The venue for the tournament is the Carom Café, which was founded by Sang Lee (not Ira Lee who is not related to Sang) and his friend Michael Kang, who was also one of the best players in the United States at that time.

Contrary to most other tournaments it was not played in the set system, but to a predetermined score. The structure of the tournament has been changed several times since 2005.

The inaugural event (2005) was won by Sweden's Torbjörn Blomdahl. The 2006 and 2007 editions were both dominated by Frédéric Caudron of Belgium. Roland Forthomme, also from Belgium, won it in 2008. The 2008 edition was the last time the event was named as Sang Lee International Open.

Verhoeven Open 
After a four-year break, the tournament was relaunched in 2012 under the name Verhoeven Open Tournament (or short Verhoeven Open) by Cindy Lee, CEO of billiards-event organizer Dragon Promotions.

In 2012, 20 players participated at the tournament. Winner was the local hero Pedro Piedrabuena, who beat Torbjörn Blomdahl from Sweden with 40:37 in the final. After a long pause of playing tournaments, the 75-year-old Belgian "Mr. 100 " Raymond Ceulemans was honors player of the tournament and could, after all, still occupy the seventh rank.

Prize money and ranking points 

The following table shows prize money and ranking points (only for USBA-players).

Tournament statistic 

The GA shows the general average (all points ÷ all innings).

Men

Women 
In 2013 for the first time a competition for women was held. It took place from July 14 to 16, right before the men's competition. Winner was world number one Therese Klompenhouwer from the Netherlands. She beat the four-time world champion Orie Hida from Japan 25:16 in 17 innings in the final. However Hida played the best individual average with 1,562. Klompenhouwer succeeded with 9 points in the best high run.

In 2015 the women's tournament was called Jennifer Shim International. The tournament was named in memory of the American elite player Jennifer Shim, who was shot on March 6, 2015, by her ex-boyfriend at the age of 41.

References

External links

 Sang Lee International Tournament Official Site
 Sang Lee International 2007 Photos
 Sang Lee International 2008 Photos
 Video Tribute to Sang Lee

Three-cushion billiards competitions
Recurring sporting events established in 2005
2005 establishments in New York City
Flushing, Queens
Cue sports in the United States